Club Deportivo, Social y Cultural Aguará, commonly referred to as Aguará, is a football club based in La Reina, Chile.

Management

Chairmen 
 María José Benavente (?—2022)

Coaches 
 Tulio Pinilla (2018—2019)
 Nicolás del Río (2019—2020)
 Felipe Luengo (2021—)

Kits 
 Home Kit: Red shirt, red shorts and red socks.
 Away Kit: Blue shirt, blue shorts and blue socks.

References

Bibliography

External 
  Aguará on Instagram

Aguará
Sport in Santiago Metropolitan Region